Robinsonia similis is a moth in the family Erebidae. It was described by Walter Rothschild in 1909. It is found in Trinidad.

References

Moths described in 1909
Robinsonia (moth)
Arctiinae of South America